Albert Salisbury Hyman (1893 - 1972), a Harvard-trained New York cardiologist, together with his brother Charles, constructed in 1930-1932 an electro-mechanical device which was one of the earliest artificial pacemakers. The device was, reportedly, tested on experiment animals and at least one human patient.

The first artificial pacemaker was invented by Australian anaesthesiologist Dr Mark C Lidwell, and was used by him to resuscitate a newborn baby at the Crown Street Women's Hospital, Sydney, in 1926. However it was Hyman who used and popularised the term "artificial pacemaker", which remains in use to this day.

Lidwell did not patent his invention and chose to remain anonymous for many years to avoid public controversy, and Hyman's machine did not gain general acceptance from the medical community, which opposed him in his attempts to popularise the use of his version of the invention.

References

External links
Timeline of great achievements
 "Beating of Heart Is Revived by Electrified Needle" Popular Mechanics, March 1933—bottom of page 360

1893 births
1972 deaths
American cardiologists
Harvard University alumni